CJOK-FM is a Canadian radio station serving the Fort McMurray, Alberta area broadcasting at 93.3 FM with a country format branded on-air as Country 93.3. The station is owned by Rogers Sports & Media.

CJOK originally began broadcasting in 1973 at 1230 kHz. In the 1980s, the station received approval by the CRTC to move to 550 kHz, however, the move was never implemented. In 1994, CJOK added an FM rebroadcaster at 95.7 MHz on Tar Island. The repeater was changed to sister station CKYX FM from a request from staff at Suncor. CJOK moved to the FM dial in 1997.

Former Logo

References

External links

 

JOK
JOK
JOK
Radio stations established in 1973
1973 establishments in Alberta